The Vlach National Party ( or , PNR; , VNS), formerly known as the Vlach Democratic Party of Serbia until 2013, is a political party in Serbia representing ethnic Vlachs. The leader of the party is Predrag Balašević, who identifies the Vlachs of the Timok Valley as Romanians and requests minority rights for the Romanian minority in the Timok Valley.

History 
The Vlach National Party was founded in 2004. It was created with the goal of preserving Vlach/Timok Romanian culture and identity in Serbia. The party participated in the 2020 Serbian parliamentary elections in a coalition with the Liberal Democratic Party and other ethnic minority parties. It cooperated with the United for the Victory of Serbia coalition during the 2022 local elections.

See also 
 Romanians in Serbia

Notes

References 

Political parties of minorities in Serbia
Political parties established in 2004
Romanians in Serbia